Abraha Hadush (born 1982) is a former Ethiopian long-distance runner who competed in the 10,000 metres. He won gold in the event at the 2000 African Championships with the time of 28:40.51.

External links

Living people
1982 births
Ethiopian male long-distance runners
20th-century Ethiopian people
21st-century Ethiopian people